St. Peter's Church in Thorner, West Yorkshire, England is an active Anglican parish church in the archdeaconry of Leeds and the Diocese of Leeds. The church is part of Elmete Trinity Benefice, which consists of the parishes of All Saints, Barwick in Elmet, St Philip's, Scholes and St Peter's, Thorner.

History

The church has a 15th-century tower; the rest of the church was largely reconstructed in 1855 by Mallinson and Healey.

Architectural style

Exterior
The church has a limestone tower, a gritstone chancel and a stone slate roof. The church is of a perpendicular style with a west tower, a south porch and a chancel embraced by north and south chapels. The tower is of two stages with angled buttresses with offsets and an octagonal clock face.

Interior
The church has arched arcades with octagonal piers with moulded capitals. The north chapel has an organ. The south chapel has wall tablets and a heraldic memorial to John Savill of Coppley (c. 1677). The church is furnished with 19th century pews and choir stalls with carved poppyheads.

See also
List of places of worship in the City of Leeds
Listed buildings in Thorner

References

External links

Thorner Church

Thorner
Thorner
Thorner